The Timber Framers Guild (the Guild) is a non-profit, international, membership organization established in 1984 in the United States to improve the quality and education of people practicing the millennia-old art of Timber framing buildings and other structures with beams joined with primarily wooden joints. Today the stated goals of the Guild are to provide "... national and regional conferences and gatherings, sponsoring community building projects, educational workshops, and publishing a member magazine, Scantlings, and a quarterly journal, Timber Framing " In 2019, the Guild purchased the Heartwood School, which had been established in 1978 to teach skills and knowledge required for building energy-efficient homes and now focuses on timber framing, serving beginning to advanced students.

The Guild is not like medieval guilds in that the emphasis is on education rather than control of this traditional trade. The Guild is not directly associated with the United Brotherhood of Carpenters and Joiners of America, but works closely with similar organizations. Overseas collaborators have included the Carpenters Fellowship in the U. K., Compagnons du Tour de France in France, and Zimmerman in Germany (a German language site).  Originally the Guild was named the Timber Framers Guild of North America but the "North America" was dropped in recognition of the Guild's international presence.

Membership
Membership in the Guild does not necessarily reflect competency but an interest in timber framing construction, learning, and/or teaching. Members are not required to practice timber framing. Most members design and/or build new timber frames, but many members restore, rehabilitate, preserve and/or study historic timber-framed buildings. The Guild also has institutional members, primarily corporations, and other partners include public agencies, educational institutions, and nonprofit organizations. The philosophies vary widely with some members being innovative and designing buildings of the future, some using computer-controlled machinery to cut frames, some working only with traditional hand-powered tools. Some members use metal connectors rather than traditional wooden joinery.

Sub-groups within or associated with the Guild
 Traditional Timberframe Research and Advisory Group (TTRAG): Part of the Timber Framers Guild officially formed in 1990.

The TTRAG is composed of members of the Timber Framers Guild who have an interest in historic timber-frame structures and their restoration and preservation. TTRAG members also document historic structures, including determining the age of buildings by dating the wooden materials using dendrochronology. Many TTRAG members also construct buildings using traditional methods and tools.

 "The Timber Frame Engineering Council (TFEC) formed in 2005 at a Guild conference in recognition of the considerable number of structural engineers among the Guild membership and in response to a felt need for systematic research, discussion, and codification of timber frame joinery and structural practices."

The TFEC has developed a Standard for the Design of Timber Framed Structures as a "...supplement to provisions of the National Design Specification for
Wood Construction..." to assist engineers in this design specialty.

 TFG Companies
Craft, and the craft of business, are deeply intertwined. The mission of TFG Companies is to expand opportunities for the timber frame industry, its businesses, and its craftsmen, and to provide education, resources, and networking for our member companies.

One of the goals of the Timber Framers Guild is to build a vital timber frame community with a strong market where all can thrive. To that end, the Guild established “TFG Companies,” which supports Guild members as they grow and manage their companies.

Community Building Projects
The Timber Framers Guild is committed to connecting with communities and people, sharing the story of timber framing, and learning and teaching through doing. Since 1985, the Timber Framers Guild has raised over 100 timber frames for communities across North America and beyond. Most structures are for public or non-profit entities, such as towns, county park agencies, federal agencies, land trusts, or community organizations. For a list of past projects since 1989 see here.

Conferences and Events
The Guild has held annual conferences and meetings since the 1980s at locations across North America. It also convenes regional meetings, workshops, and community building projects.

Apprenticeship Program 
The Guild created a training program for apprentices to learn the art and science of traditional timber framing from mentors called journeyworkers. "Successful apprentices receive a nationally recognized credential registered by the United States Department of Labor under our program number NO152090893. This program uses a formal curriculum which is being revised.

Publications
The Guild publishes a magazine for members (Scantlings), a respected technical journal (Timber Framing), and books on the specialized topics of traditional timber framing and engineering. The Guild also lists other relevant books, software and a Glossary of timber framing terms. An important record of historic timber frame joints found in the US is Historic American Timber Joinery: A Graphic Guide which was partially funded by a grant from National Park Service and the National Center for Preservation Technology and Training and thus is available for free download. This guide is expanding as new types of joints are found and recorded.

Leadership
The current executive director of the Guild is Dr. Eric S. Howard, a nonprofit executive with 30 years of leadership in sustainability and education. Prior directors include Mack Magee, Jeff Arvin, Joel McCarty, Brenda Baker, and Will Beemer.

See also
 Timber roof trusses
 Barn raising
 Pike pole
 Mortise and tenon
 Barn

References

External links 
 Timber Framers Guild website
 "Behavior and Modeling of Wood-Pegged Timber Frames", Journal of Structural Engineering 1999
 "The North American Timber Frame Housing Industry", Forest Products Journal 1999

Timber framing
Vernacular architecture
Woodworking
Guilds in the United States